This is a list of women writers who were born in Germany or whose writings are closely associated with it.

A
Maximiliane Ackers (1896–1982), lesbian actress, novelist, scriptwriter
Martha Albrand (1914–1981), novelist
Helene Adler (1849–1923), German Jewish poet and educator
 Hannah Arendt (1906–1975), German Jewish political theorist
 Bettina von Arnim (1785–1859), writer, novelist
 Ludmilla Assing (1785–1859), short story writer, biographer
 Anita Augspurg (1857–1943), feminist, lawyer, actress
 Elisabeth Augustin (1903–2001), poet, short story writer, novelist, wrote in German and Dutch
 Frau Ava (c.1060–1127), first woman writer in German

B
 Ingrid Bachér (born 1930), playwright, screenwriter
 Bertha Badt-Strauss (1885–1970), journalist, biographer, translator
 Amalie Baisch (1859–1904), writer of etiquette guide books
 Zsuzsa Bánk (born 1965), novelist
 Gertrud Bäumer (1873–1954), writer, feminist
 Sybille Bedford (1873–1954), German born English-language novelist, non-fiction writer, memoirist
 Maria Beig (1920–2018), novelist
 Hedwig von Beit (1896–1973), folklorist
 Margot Benary-Isbert (1889–1979), children's writer in German and English
 Josefa Berens-Totenohl (1891–1969), novelist
 Sibylle Berg (born 1962), successful novelist, essayist, short story writer, playwright
 Dörthe Binkert (born 1949), novelist, non-fiction writer 
 Charlotte Birch-Pfeiffer (c. 1800–1868), playwright, actress
 Anne Birk (1942–2009), novelist
 Ilse Blumenthal-Weiss (1899–1987), poet
 Helene Böhlau (1859–1940), novelist
 Emily Bold (born 1980), novelist 
 Margarete Böhme (1867–1939), novelist, author of Tagebuch einer Verlorenen
 Vera Botterbusch (born 1942), journalist, film producer
Johanna Braun (1929–2008), German writer
Angelika Brandt (born 1961), deep-sea biologist, non-fiction writer
 Lily Braun (1865–1916), feminist writer
 Christine Brückner (1921–1996), novelist, short story writer, children's writer
 Traude Bührmann (born 1942), novelist, journalist, translator
 Margarethe von Bülow (1860-1884), novelist

C
 Marie Calm (1832–1887), instructional book writer, novelist, poet
 Elisabeth Castonier (1894–1975), children's writer, journalist, writing in German and English
 Helmina von Chézy (1783–1856), poet, playwright, librettist
 Helene Christaller (1872–1953), children's novelist
 Zehra Çırak (born 1960), Turkish-born German poet, short story writer
 Hedwig Courths-Mahler (1867–1950), novelist

D
 Utta Danella (1920–2015), novelist
 Gertrud David (1872–1936), journalist, filmmaker
 Henriette Davidis (1801–1876), cookbook writer
 Hilde Domin (1909–2006), poet
 Marion Dönhoff (1909–2002), acclaimed journalist, non-fiction writer
 Doris Dörrie (born 1955), novelist, film director
 Ingeborg Drewitz (1923–1986), playwright, novelist
 Annette von Droste-Hülshoff (1797–1848), poet
 Karen Duve (born 1961), novelist and short story writer

E

 Elizabeth Charlotte, Princess Palatine (in German: Liselotte von der Pfalz) (1652–1722), letter writer
 Margareta Ebner, (1291–1351), diarist, mystic
Susanna Eger (1640–1713), cook and cookbook writer, author of Leipziger Kochbuch (1706) 
 Gisela Elsner (1937–1992), novelist
 Helene von Engelhardt (1850–1910), Baltic German poet, writer, translator
 Aslı Erdoğan (born 1967), human rights activist, novelist, columnist, one novel translated into English
 Jenny Erpenbeck (born 1967), novelist
 Nataly von Eschstruth (1860–1939), novelist

F
 Eva Figes (1932–2012), German-born English novelist, critic, memoirist
 Caroline Auguste Fischer (1764–1842), writer and women's rights activist
 Marieluise Fleißer (1901–1974), playwright
 Meta Forkel-Liebeskind (1765–1853), writer, translator
 Julia Franck (born 1970), novelist
 Louise von François (1817–1893), novelist
 Friederike Fless (born 1964), classical archaeologist
 Bella Fromm (1901–1974), journalist, diarist 
 Cornelia Funke (born 1958), children's writer, author of The Thief Lord, Inkheart series

G
 Miriam Gebhardt (born 1962), historian, non-fiction writer
 Doris Gercke, (born 1937), pen name Mary-Jo Morell, crime thriller novelist
 Karen Gershon, (1923–1993), German-born English poet, novelist, non-fiction writer 
 Glückel of Hameln (1646–1724), Yiddish-language diarist
 Helga Goetze (1922–2008), poet and artist
 Claire Goll (1890–1977), German-born poet, novelist, writing in German and French
 Natalie Grams (born 1978), German physician, writer, scientific skeptic, former homeopath
 Argula von Grumbach (1492–1554), poet, letter writer, first Protestant woman writer
 Karoline von Günderrode (1780–1806), poet

H
 Ida, Countess of Hahn-Hahn (1805–1880), German novelist
 Thea von Harbou (1888–1954), novelist, screenwriter
 Petra Hartmann (born 1970), journalist, novelist, children's writer
 Uta-Maria Heim (born 1963), playwright, novelist, poet
 Emmy Hennings (1885–1948), poet, performer
 Ulrike Henschke (1830–1897), novelist and writer on educational theory.
 Luise Hensel (1798–1876), religious writer, poet
 Clara Hepner (1860-1939), children's stories
 Judith Hermann (born 1970), short story writer
 Elisabeth von Heyking (1861–1925), novelist, travel writer, diarist
 Hildegard of Bingen (1098–1179), mystic, playwright, poet writing in Latin
 Wilhelmine von Hillern (1836–1916), actress, novelist, short story writer
 Karla Höcker (1901–1992), novelist, biographer
 Barbara Honigmann (born 1949), novelist 
 Hrotsvith von Gandersheim (c.935–c.1002), dramatist, poet, writing in Latin
 Therese Huber (1764–1829), novelist, short story writer, essayist, translator
 Ricarda Huch (1864–1947), historian, novelist, poet

J
Margarethe Jodl (1859–1937), writer and women's rights activist

K
 Yadé Kara (born 1965), Turkish-German novelist 
 Anna Louisa Karsch (1722–1791), poet, letter writer
 Marie Luise Kaschnitz (1901–1974), leading post-war poet, short story writer, essayist
 Judith Kerr (1923–2019), German-born children's writer in English
 Hedwig Kettler (1851–1937), short story writer, activist, education reformer
 Irmgard Keun (1905–1982), novelist
 Johanna Kinkel (1810–1858), novelist, non-fiction works on music, autobiographer
 Sarah Kirsch (1935–2013), poet, translator
 Karin Kiwus (born 1942), poet
 Annette Kolb (1870–1967), novelist, pacifist, non-fiction writer
 Gertrud Kolmar (1894–1943), poet
 Clementine Krämer (1873–1942), short story writer, poet, social worker, activist
 Ursula Krechel (born 1947), poet, novelist, playwright, critic
 Brigitte Kronauer (1940–2019), novelist
 Isolde Kurz (1853–1944), acclaimed poet, short story writer

L
 Vera Lachmann (1904–1985), poet, classicist, educator
 Hedwig Lachmann (1865–1918), author, translator and poet
 Nuray Lale (born 1962), Turkish-German writer, translator
 Ruth Landshoff (1904–1966), German-American actress, novelist, poet, columnist, wrote in German and English
 Katja Lange-Müller (born 1951), novelist
 Elisabeth Langgässer (1899–1950), poet, novelist
 Sophie von La Roche (1730–1807), novelist
 Else Lasker-Schüler (1869–1945), poet, playwright
 Gertrud von Le Fort (1876–1971), novelist, poet, essayist
 Katerina Lemmel (1466–1533), letter-writer, nun
 Ellen Lenneck (1851–1880), novelist, short story writer
 Fanny Lewald (1811–1889), novelist, feminist
 Sonia Levitin (born 1934), German-born English-language children's and young adults' writer, essayist
 Sibylle Lewitscharoff (born 1954), novelist
 Mechtilde Lichnowsky (1879–1958), poet, playwright, essayist
 Angela Litschev (born 1978), Bulgarian-born German poet
 Cornelia Lüdecke (born 1954), polar researcher, historian

M
 Heidrun E. Mader (born 1977), German theologian
 Erika Mann (1905–1969), anti-Nazi writer, performer, daughter of Thomas Mann
 E. Marlitt (Eugenie John, 1825–1877), novelist
 Monika Maron (born 1941), essayist, political writer
 Petra Mathers (born 1945), German-born American children's writer, illustrator
 Mechthild of Magdeburg (c.1207–c.1282/94), mystic, writing in Low German
 Saint Mechtilde of Hackeborn (1240/41–1298), religious writer in Latin
 Sophie Mereau (1770–1806), novelist, poet
 Malwida von Meysenbug (1816–1903), political writer, memoirist
 Agnes Miegel (1879–1964), journalist, writer, poet
 Jo Mihaly (1902–1989), diarist, novelist, dancer
 Irmtraud Morgner (1933–1990), novelist
 Petra Morsbach (born 1956), novelist
 Lisel Mueller (1924–2020), German-born American poet
 Luise Mühlbach (1814–1873), historical novelist, many works translated into English
 Inge Müller (1925–1966), poet, playwright, children's writer
 Herta Müller (born 1953), Romanian-born German novelist, poet, and essayist, Nobel Prize winner

N
 Benedikte Naubert (1752–1819), historical novelist
 Friederike Caroline Neuber (1697–1760), playwright, actress
 Hildegard Maria Nickel (born 1948), sociologist specializing in gender studies
 Charlotte Niese (1854–1935), non-fiction writer, poet
 Ingrid Noll (born 1935), novelist
 Helga M. Novak (1935–2013),  poet, political writer

O
 Louise Otto-Peters (1819–1895), poet, journalist, feminist
 Angelika Overath (born 1957), author, journalist
 Emine Sevgi Özdamar (born 1946), Turkish-born German novelist, playwright

P
 Henriette Paalzow (1788–1847), historical novelist
 Peggy Parnass (born 1927), actress, columnist, court reporter, short story writer, memoirist
 Annette Pehnt (born 1967), literary critic
 Marie Petersen (1816–1859), story writer, author of the fairy tale Princess Ilse
 Luise von Ploennies (1803–1872), poet, translator
 Karla Poewe (born 1941), anthropologist, non-fiction writer
 Luise F. Pusch (born 1944), linguist, feminist, essayist

R
 Elisa von der Recke (Elisabeth Recke) (1754–1833), writer, poet from Courland
 Eva Gabriele Reichmann (1897–1998), historian, works on anti-Semitism
 Brigitte Reimann (1933–1973), novelist
 Annemarie Reinhard (1921–1976), novelist, children's writer
 Christa Reinig (1926–2008), poet, novelist, non-fiction writer, playwright
 Gabriele Reuter (1859–1941), novelist, essayist, children's writer
 Jutta Richter (born 1955), children's writer
 Brigitte Riebe (also Laura Stern) (born 1953), novelist
 Luise Rinser (1911–2002), novelist, autobiographer, children's writer
 Ruth Margarete Roellig (1878–1969), novelist, travel writer, journalist
 Anna Rosmus (born 1960), non-fiction writer, works on Nazi treatment of Jews
 Friederike Roth (born 1948), playwright
 Alice Rühle-Gerstel (1894–1943), journalist, psychologist, feminist
 Anna Rüling, pen name of Theo Anna Sprüngli (1880–1953), journalist, LGBT activist

S
 Lessie Sachs (1897–1942), poet and artist
 Nelly Sachs (1891–1970),  poet, playwright
 Rahel Sanzara, (1894–1936), novelist
 Oda Schaefer (1900–1988), poet, journalist
 Maria Sophia Schellhammer (bapt. 1647–1719), cookbook writer
 Caroline Schelling (1763–1809), essayist, critic, correspondent
 Dorothea von Schlegel (1764–1839), novelist, translator
 Elke Schmitter (born 1961), novelist
 Elizabeth of Schönau (1129–1165), visionary writing in Latin
 Amalie Schoppe (1791–1858), children's writer
 Claudia Schoppmann (born 1958), historian, nonfiction writer
 Martina Schradi (born 1972), writer, cartoonist
 Adele Schreiber-Krieger (1872–1957), journalist, screenwriter, politician
 Angelika Schrobsdorff (1927–2016), best selling novelist, actress
 Helga Schubert (born 1940), novelist
 Sibylla Schwarz (1621–1638), Baroque poet
 Anna Seghers (1900–1983), novelist, author of The Seventh Cross
 Angela Sommer-Bodenburg (born 1948), children's writer, author of The Little Vampire
 Gesine Spieß (1945–2016), educationalist specializing in gender studies
 Ilse von Stach (1879–1941), playwright, novelist, poet
 Charlotte von Stein, (1742–1827), dramatist, friend of Goethe
 Gisela Steineckert (born 1931), poet, songwriter
 Ginka Steinwachs (born 1942), novelist, playwright, nonfiction writer
 Eva Strittmatter (1930–2011), poet, children's writer
 Antje Rávic Strubel (born 1974), novelist
 Karin Struck (1947–2006), short story writer, novelist
Herma Studeny (1886–1973) poet, nonfiction writer

T
Fanny Tarnow (1779–1862), short story writer, playwright
Renata Thiele (born c.1960), Polish-born German novelist, short story writer, editor
Adrienne Thomas, pen name of Hertha A. Deutsch (1897–1980), autobiographical novelist
Dorothea Tieck (1799–1841), translator of Shakespeare
Canan Topçu (born 1965), Turkish-German writer, works on Turkish immigration in German

V
 Rahel Varnhagen (1771–1833), essayist, correspondent
 Clara Viebig (1862–1952), novelist, playwright
 Hermine Villinger (1849-1917), novelist and short story writer
 Helene Voigt-Diederichs (1875–1961), travel writer, novelist, short story writer

W
 Marianne Weber (1870–1954), women's rights activist, nonfiction writer
 Ruth Weiss (1928–2020), German-born American poet, performer, playwright
 Anna Elisabet Weirauch (1887–1970), playwright, novelist
 Ruth Westheimer (born Karola Siegel, 1928), German-American sex therapist, talk show host, author, professor, Holocaust survivor, and former Haganah sniper.
 Ottilie Wildermuth (1817–1877), children's writer, novelist, biographer
 Gabriele Wohmann (1932–2015), novelist, short story writer
 Christa Wolf (1929–2011), novelist, critic, essayist
 Caroline von Wolzogen (1763–1847), novelist, biographer
 Mathilde Wurm (1874–1935), politician, journalist

Z
 Sidonia Hedwig Zäunemann (1711–1740), poet
 Susanna Elizabeth Zeidler (1657–c.1706), poet
 Juli Zeh (born 1974), novelist, author of Eagles and Angels 
 Eva Zeller (1923–2022), poet, novelist
 Hedda Zinner (also Elisabeth Frank, 1905–1994), political writer
 Kathinka Zitz-Halein (1801–1877), poet, biographer
 Unica Zürn (1916–1970), poet, artist

See also
List of women writers
List of Austrian women writers
List of Swiss women writers
List of Luxembourg women writers
List of German-language authors

References

-
German women writers, List of
Women writers, List of German
Writers